McDermit may refer to:

Gaye McDermit, New Zealand fencer
Fort McDermit, American fort in Nevada